Emir Hrkalović (born May 17, 1991) is Serbian biathlete.

He represents Serbia at the Biathlon World Championships, Biathlon World Cup and IBU Cup.

The best result in his career so far is 10th place in 20 km individual during the 2nd stage of 2013/14 IBU Cup held in Beitostolen, Norway.

References

Serbian male biathletes
Living people
1991 births
Place of birth missing (living people)